This is a list of notable Irish Americans, including both original immigrants who obtained American citizenship and their American-born descendants. For more information see also: List of Americans of Irish descent.

List
"To be included in this list, the person must have a Wikipedia article showing they are Irish American or must have references showing they are Irish American and are notable."

Actors

Arts

 Mathew Brady – photographer 
 Kurt Cobain – songwriter and musician, lead singer of Nirvana
 Jerome Connor – sculptor
 Thomas Crawford – sculptor 
 Michael Flatley – dancer
 William Harnett – painter, Irish immigrant best known for trompe-l'œil renderings of still life
 George Peter Alexander Healy – portrait painter
 Thomas Hovenden – painter 
 Carrie Ann Inaba – dancer, actress; mother of Chinese and Irish descent
 Gene Kelly – dancer, actor, singer, director, choreographer
 James E. Kelly – sculptor and illustrator 
 Thomas Lanigan-Schmidt – artist, activist
 Edward McCartan – sculptor 
 Samuel Murray – sculptor
 Jim Morrison – singer, frontman of the Doors
 John Neagle – painter
 William Rudolf O'Donovan – sculptor
 Georgia O'Keeffe – painter
 Timothy H. O'Sullivan – photographer 
 Maurice J. Power – sculptor, politician, foundry owner
 John Ramage – miniaturist 
 George Reynolds – painter, student of Eakins, Civil War Medal of Honor
 Augustus Saint-Gaudens – sculptor
 Louis Saint-Gaudens – sculptor, brother of Augustus Saint-Gaudens
 John Talbott Donoghue – sculptor

Business
 Joseph P. Kennedy Sr. – former ambassador to the UK and father of President JFK.
 Diamond Jim Brady – financier and philanthropist
 Dawn Fitzpatrick – Global Head of Equities, Multi-Asset and O'Connor at UBS Asset Management
 John L. Flannery – former CEO of General Electric
 Henry Ford – founder of Ford Motor Company
 Paul Galvin – inventor of the car radio; founder of Motorola
 Franklin B. Gowen – lawyer, president of the Philadelphia and Reading Railroad, prosecuted the trial against the Molly Maguires
 Herb Kelleher – Southwest Airlines chairman
 John Leahy – COO of Airbus; commercial pilot
 Mike McGrath – Chief Justice of Montana Supreme Court 
 Shane McMahon – minority owner of WWE 
 Stephanie McMahon – CBO of WWE 
 Vince McMahon – CEO of WWE
 Tom Monaghan – founder of Domino's Pizza
 Richard and Maurice McDonald – founders of McDonald's
 Edward Creighton – Omaha businessman and philanthropist
 John A. Creighton – Omaha businessman and philanthropist
 Michael J. Cullen - Founder of King Kullen, inventor of the supermarket
 Marcus Daly (1841–1900) – A "Copper King" of Butte, Montana, United States
 William Russell Grace (1832–1904) – mayor of New York City and founder of W. R. Grace and Company
 Pat Powers – businessman and film producer
 Bill Rancic – entrepreneur
 Joseph F. Sinnott – owner of Moore and Sinnott, the largest rye whiskey distillery in the United States prior to Prohibition.
 Jack Welch – former CEO of General Electric
 George Croghan - fur trader 
Edmund McIlhenny – inventor of hot sauce
Bill Gates – co-founder of Microsoft
Thomas Mellon
Louis Sullivan – inventor of the skyscraper
Charles Stark Draper – Anglo-Irish
George Bryan

Educators
 Mary Harris Jones – "Mother Jones", educator and labor organizer 
 Christa McAuliffe – teacher-astronaut who was killed in the 1986 Space Shuttle Challenger disaster; also has Lebanese ancestry
Joseph S. Murphy (1933–1998) – President of Queens College, President of Bennington College, and Chancellor of the City University of New York
 Victoria Leigh Soto – educator who was killed in the 2012 Sandy Hook Elementary School shooting; hid students and died trying to protect them

Film directors, producers and scriptwriters
 Rafael Casal (1985–) – American writer, actor, producer, and showrunner. He is of Irish, Spanish, and Cuban descent.
 Roy E. Disney (1930–2009) – senior executive for The Walt Disney Company and son of Roy O. Disney
 Roy O. Disney (1893–1971) – Walt Disney's brother
 Walt Disney (1901–1966)
 Thom Fitzgerald – known for independent films like The Hanging Garden; born in New York; his grandparents were immigrants from County Kerry and County Cavan, Ireland
 John Ford (1894–1973) – director, best known for stylish Westerns and the film classic The Quiet Man
 Mel Gibson (1956–) – known for both writing and directing the highest grossing rated R film of all time ($370,782,930), The Passion of the Christ
 Alfred Hitchcock (1899–1980)
 John Huston (1906–1987)
 Rex Ingram (1892–1950)
 Leo McCarey (1898–1969)
 Michael Moore (1954–)
 John Sayles (1950–) – independent film director and writer, frequently takes a small part in his own and other indie films
 Mack Sennett (1880–1960)
 Quentin Tarantino (1963–)
 William Desmond Taylor (1872–1922) 
 Raoul Walsh (1887–1980)
 William A. Wellman (1896–1975)
 Shannen Doherty
 Pat Powers (businessman)

Gangsters and mobsters

Law enforcement
 Raymond W. Kelly – former New York Police Commissioner
 Francis O'Neill – Chicago Police Chief
 Brian Terry – United States Border Patrol Agent, BORTAC (USBP Tactical Response Team) Operator
 Charles V. Glasco – New York City Police Sergeant who served in the New York City Police Department from June 1926 to July 1948
 Buckey O'Neill
 William J. Brady
 Bat Masterson

Law
 James Duane 
 William J. Brennan, Jr. – Associate Justice of the Supreme Court of the United States
 Sandra Day O'Connor – Associate Justice of the Supreme Court of the United States
 Wayne M. Collins – civil rights attorney
 James B. Comey – former United States Deputy Attorney General
 Charles Patrick Daly – Chief Justice of the New York Court of Common Pleas
 Patrick Fitzgerald – United States Attorney for the Northern District of Illinois
 Anthony Kennedy – Associate Justice of the Supreme Court of the United States
 Robert F. Kennedy – United States Attorney General
 Roger I. McDonough – Chief Justice of the Utah Supreme Court
 Frank Murphy – Associate Justice of the Supreme Court of the United States
 Roger J. Traynor – Chief Justice of the Supreme Court of California
 James Sullivan (governor)
 George Wythe McCook
 James Clark McReynolds
Charles Carroll (barrister)

Literature
 Philip Barry – playwright; author of The Philadelphia Story
 L. Frank Baum – author of The Wonderful Wizard of Oz
 Ted Berrigan – poet, part of the second generation of the New York School; author of The Sonnets
 John Berryman – poet; one of the founders of the Confessional school of poetry
 Louise Bogan – poet, translator, and critic; served as Poet Laureate of the United States 1945–1946
 T. Coraghessan Boyle – novelist and short story writer; awarded the 1988 PEN/Faulkner Award for his novel World's End
 Bill Bryson – travel writer; awarded an honorary OBE for his contribution to literature
 John Horne Burns – novelist and travel writer; author of The Gallery
 Jim Carroll – author, poet, and punk musician; author of The Basketball Diaries
 Neal Cassady – author and poet; provided the basis for the character Dean Moriarty in Jack Kerouac's novel On the Road
 Raymond Chandler – novelist and short story writer; author of the Philip Marlowe detective series that shaped the modern "private eye" story
 Mary Coyle Chase – playwright and screenwriter; awarded the 1945 Pulitzer Prize for Drama for Harvey
 Kate Chopin – novelist and short story writer; her novel The Awakening (1899) is considered a proto-feminist precursor to American modernism
 Tom Clancy – novelist; author of many bestselling novels, including The Hunt for Red October and Clear and Present Danger
 Mary Higgins Clark – bestselling author of suspense novels
 Billy Collins – poet; served two terms as Poet Laureate of the United States 2001–2003
 Joe Connelly – novelist; author of Bringing Out the Dead
 Michael Connelly – crime novelist; author of the bestselling Harry Bosch detective series
 Pat Conroy – novelist and memoirist; author of The Great Santini and The Prince of Tides
 Robert Creeley – poet and author associated with the Black Mountain poets; awarded a 2000 American Book Award Lifetime Achievement Award
 Maureen Daly – novelist and short story writer; her novel Seventeenth Summer (1942) is considered the first young adult novel
 Philip K. Dick – science fiction author
 J.P. Donleavy – novelist; author of The Ginger Man, named on the Modern Library List of Best 20th-Century Novels
 Kirby Doyle – poet and novelist; associated with the New American Poetry movement and "third generation" American modernist poets
 Alan Dugan – poet; winner of the 1961 Pulitzer Prize for Poetry for his volume Poems
 James T. Farrell – novelist; author of the Studs Lonigan trilogy, named on the Modern Library List of Best 20th-Century Novels
 F. Scott Fitzgerald – novelist and short story writer; his novel The Great Gatsby was named on both the Modern Library List of Best 20th-Century Novels and the TIME 100 Best English-Language Novels from 1923 to 2005
 Robert Fitzgerald – poet, critic, and translator; served as Poet Laureate of the United States 1984–1985
 Thomas Flanagan – novelist and academic; winner of the 1979 National Book Critics Circle Award for The Year of the French
 Vince Flynn – political thriller novelist; author of bestselling Mitch Rapp series
 Alice Fulton – poet and short story writer; awarded the 2002 Bobbitt National Prize for Poetry for Felt
 Tess Gallagher – poet, short story writer, essayist, and playwright
 Lucy Grealy – poet, memoirist, and essayist; author of Autobiography of a Face
 Pete Hamill – journalist, columnist, novelist, and short story writer
 George V. Higgins – novelist, columnist, and academic; known for his best-selling crime novels, including The Friends of Eddie Coyle
 Fanny Howe – poet, novelist, and short-story writer; awarded the 2001 Lenore Marshall Poetry Prize for Selected Poems
 Marie Howe – poet; winner of the 1987 Open Competition of the National Poetry Series for The Good Thief
 Susan Howe – poet and literary critic; awarded American Book Awards in 1981 for The Liberties and 1986 for My Emily Dickinson
 Brigit Pegeen Kelly – poet; finalist for the 2005 Pulitzer Prize for Poetry for The Orchard
 Myra Kelly – novelist and schoolteacher
 Robert Kelly – poet associated with the deep image group; awarded a 1980 American Book Award for In Time
 William Kennedy – novelist and author, winner of the 1983 National Book Critics Circle Award for Fiction, 1984 Pulitzer Prize for Fiction for Ironweed, and a 1984 American Book Award for O Albany!
 X. J. Kennedy – poet, translator, anthologist, editor, and children's author
 Richard Kenney – poet and academic
 Jean Kerr – author and Tony Award-winning playwright
 Galway Kinnell – poet; awarded the 1983 Pulitzer Prize for Poetry and 1983 National Book Award for Poetry for Selected Poems
 R. A. Lafferty – Hugo- and Nebula-nominated science fiction author
 Michael Lally – poet and author; awarded a 2000 American Book Award for It's Not Nostalgia: Poetry and Prose
 James Laughlin – poet and publisher; winner of the 1989 National Book Critics Circle Award Lifetime Achievement Award and the 1992 National Book Awards Medal of Distinguished Contribution to American Letters; namesake of the annual James Laughlin Award administered by the Academy of American Poets
 Dennis Lehane – novelist, author of A Drink Before the War and Mystic River
 John Logan – poet and academic; awarded the 1982 Lenore Marshall Poetry Prize for Only the Dreamer Can Change the Dream
 William Logan – poet, critic, and scholar; awarded the 2005 National Book Critics Circle Award for Criticism for The Undiscovered Country: Poetry in the Age of Tin
 Thomas Lynch – poet and essayist; awarded a 1998 American Book Award for The Undertaking: Life Studies from the Dismal Trade
 Michael Patrick MacDonald – memoirist; winner of a 2000 American Book Award for All Souls: A Family Story From Southie
 Cormac McCarthy – novelist and playwright; author of Blood Meridian and winner of the 2007 Pulitzer Prize for Fiction for The Road
 Frank McCourt – memoirist; winner of the 1996 National Book Critics Circle Award and the 1997 Pulitzer Prize for Biography or Autobiography for Angela's Ashes
 Alice McDermott – novelist; awarded the 1998 National Book Award and a 1999 American Book Award for Charming Billy
 Brian McDonough-author, physician
 Campbell McGrath – poet
 Thomas McGrath – poet; awarded a 1984 American Book Award for Echoes Inside the Labyrinth and the 1989 Lenore Marshall Poetry Prize for Selected Poems: 1938–1988
 Thomas McGuane – novelist, screenwriter, and short story writer; nominated for a National Book Award for Ninety-Two in the Shade
 Jay McInerney – novelist; author of Bright Lights, Big City
 James McMichael – poet; awarded the 1999 Arthur Rense Prize
 Terrence McNally – playwright; winner of six Tony Awards and nominated for the 1994 Pulitzer Prize for Drama for A Perfect Ganesh
 Maile Meloy – novelist and short story writer; awarded The Paris Review's 2001 Aga Khan Prize for Fiction for her story "Aqua Boulevard"
 Margaret Mitchell – novelist; awarded the 1937 Pulitzer Prize for Gone with the Wind
 Helen Curtin Moskey – poet
 Robert C. O'Brien – journalist and children's author; awarded the 1972 Newbery Medal for Mrs. Frisby and the Rats of NIMH
 Tim O'Brien – novelist and short story writer; prominent author of fiction about the Vietnam War, including The Things They Carried, a finalist for both the Pulitzer Prize and the National Book Critics Circle Award
 Edwin O'Connor – novelist, winner of the 1962 Pulitzer Prize for Fiction for The Edge of Sadness
 Flannery O'Connor – novelist and short story writer; notable author in the Southern Gothic style
 Frank O'Hara – poet, prominent member of the New York School
 John O'Hara – novelist; author of Appointment in Samarra, named one of the TIME 100 Best English-Language Novels from 1923 to 2005
 Charles Olson – poet and critic, associated with the second generation American Modernist poets; author of The Maximus Poems
 Eugene O'Neill – playwright; awarded the 1936 Nobel Prize for Literature and four-time winner of the Pulitzer Prize for Drama
Edgar Allan Poe - writer, poet, editor, and literary critic
 J.F. Powers – novelist and short story writer; winner of the 1963 National Book Award for Morte d'Urban
 Anne Rice – horror novelist; author of bestselling Interview with a Vampire series
 Ryan Max Riley – humorist and freestyle mogul skier on the US Ski Team
 Nora Roberts – romance novelist; first inductee into the Romance Writers of America Hall of Fame
 Kay Ryan – poet and academic; currents Poet Laureate of the United States
 Michael Ryan – poet; awarded the 1990 Lenore Marshall Poetry Prize for God Hunger
 John Patrick Shanley – playwright and screenwriter; winner of the 2005 Pulitzer Prize for Drama for Doubt: A Parable
 Nicholas Sparks – author and screenwriter
 Mickey Spillane – crime novelist; author of bestselling Mike Hammer detective novels
 John Kennedy Toole – novelist; posthumously awarded the 1981 Pulitzer Prize for Fiction for A Confederacy of Dunces
 Jim Tully – novelist, playwright, best known for Beggars of Life
 Michael Walsh – novelist and screenwriter; awarded a 2004 American Book Award for And All The Saints
 Roger Zelazny – fantasy and science fiction author; winner of three Nebula Awards and six Hugo Awards

Media and journalists
 Tom Kenny
 Loretta Lynn
 Dennis Quaid
 Karen Allen
 Jim Acosta 
 Mike Barnicle
 Bob Costas
 Greta Van Susteren
 Nellie Bly
 Joseph I. Breen
 Jimmy Breslin
 Howie Carr – author, Boston newspaper columnist and New England radio talk-show host; has claimed family "two-boater" Irish ancestry (i.e., Ireland-to-Canada, then Canada-to-Maine) on his father's side
 Neil Cavuto
 Carson Daly
 Phil Donahue
 Maureen Dowd
 Brian Doyle-Murray
 Roger Ebert
 Pete Hamill
 Sean Hannity
 Greg Kelly 
 Megyn Kelly 
 Chris Matthews
 Bill Murray
 Joel Murray
 Peggy Noonan (1950– ) – author, political analyst and pundit for the Republican Party
 Nicole O'Brian – model, pageant contestant, and reality television contestant
 Conan O'Brien
 Soledad O'Brien
 Norah O'Donnell
 Michael O'Looney – New York-based reporter; later a business executive with Merrill Lynch
 Bill O'Reilly
 John L. O'Sullivan
 Regis Philbin
 Dennis Roddy
 Tim Russert (1950–2008) – journalist, hosted NBC's Meet the Press from 1991 until his death in 2008
 John B. Sheridan (1870–1930) – sports journalist (Sporting News)
 Ed Sullivan
 Elizabeth Vargas
 John Walsh
 Brian Williams
 Ellen DeGeneres
 Smith Hart
 Bruce Hart
 Keith Hart
 Dean Hart
 Bret Hart
 Ross Hart
 Diana Hart
 Owen Hart
 Ireland Baldwin
 Alec Baldwin
 Daniel Baldwin
 Stephen Baldwin
 William Baldwin
 Emily Deschanel
 Nicole Sullivan
 Kevin Conroy
 Tim McGraw
 Debbie Reynolds

Military

John Barry – father of the United States Navy; Irish-born
Patrick Edward Connor – Union general born in Kerry 
Michael Corcoran – United States Army general
James Hickey – leader of Operation Red Dawn; son of Irish immigrants
Stephen W. Kearny – US Army officer, noted for action in the southwest during the Mexican–American War
David Conner (naval officer)
Andrew Lewis – Continental Army general
Alfred Thayer Mahan – naval officer and author whose work, including Sea Power, inspired the creation of the modern United States Navy
Dennis Hart Mahan – guiding light and head of faculty at West Point for decades prior to the Civil War; influential author whose published works were the keystone for spreading engineering knowledge throughout the antebellum US; his Napoleon seminar at West Point informed Civil War strategies, North and South
George Gordon Meade – commanding general of the Army of the Potomac who led the Union forces to victory at Gettysburg in 1863
Thomas Francis Meagher – United States Army general, Fenian
Richard Montgomery – Continental Army general
Audie Murphy – most decorated combat soldier of World War II
Lt. Michael Patrick Murphy – Navy Seal, Medal of Honor
Timothy Murphy – marksman, Continental Army; parents were Irish immigrants 
Thomas Macdonough, Jr. 19th-century Irish-American naval officer
Jeremiah O'Brien – captain in Continental Navy
Joseph T. O'Callaghan – Medal of Honor
John O'Neill – United States Army general, Fenian 
John P. O'Neill – high ranking anti-terrorism expert
Molly Pitcher – Revolutionary War heroine
John Reynolds – general commanding the right wing of the Army of the Potomac who surprised Lee and committed the Union Army to battle at Gettysburg in July 1863; killed in the front lines while personally rallying troops for counterattacks during the first day of fighting
Philip Sheridan – United States Army, General of the Army, Cavalry
John Sullivan – Continental Army general
William M. Browne
Richard Busteed
Joseph Finegan
William Gamble
James Hagan
James Lawlor Kiernan
Walter P. Lane
Michael Kelly Lawler
Patrick Theodore Moore
James Shields
Thomas Alfred Smyth
Thomas William Sweeny
James McLaughlin
Samuel Brady
James Clinton Anglo-Irish
Stephen Moylan
James Moore (Continental Army officer)
Hercules Mulligan
Thomas Hickey (soldier)
Richard Butler (general)
Edward Hand
John Shee – Revolutionary War hero Colonel John Shee
John Fitzgerald established the first catholic church of Virginia and Aide-De-Camp to George Washington
Thomas McInerney
Thomas White (patriot)
Simon Girty
Charles Clinton
Myles Keogh
Patrick Edward Connor
Stephen Joseph McGroarty
Robert Nugent (officer)
John McCausland
Lawrence O'Bryan Branch
Peter O'Brien (Medal of Honor)
John Gregory Bourke
Edmond Butler
Henry D. O'Brien
 Out of the 115 killed at Battle of Bunker Hill 22 were Irish-born some of their names include Callaghan, Casey, Collins, Connelly, Dillon, Donohue, Flynn, McGrath, Nugent, Shannon, and Sullivan
Robert Magaw
 Capt. Daniel Neil – Revolutionary war hero
 John Rutledge – Anglo-Irish
 Richard Byrnes
 Bennet C. Riley
 Philip Kearny

Musicians

Politicians

Presidents
At least 22 presidents of the United States have some Irish ancestral origins, although the extent of this varies. For instance President Clinton claims Irish ancestry despite there being no documentation of any of his ancestors coming from Ireland, but Kennedy on the other hand have strong documented Irish origins. Also Ronald Reagan's great-grandfather was an Irish Roman Catholic. Kennedy and Joe Biden were raised as a practicing Catholics.

Joe Biden (Irish and English) 
 46th U.S. President a practicing catholic.
Andrew Jackson (Scotch-Irish and English)
 7th President 1829–37: He was born in the predominantly Ulster-Scots Waxhaws area of South Carolina two years after his parents left Boneybefore, near Carrickfergus in County Antrim. A heritage centre in the village pays tribute to the legacy of 'Old Hickory', the People's President. Andrew Jackson then moved to Tennessee, where he served as Governor
James Knox Polk (Scotch-Irish)
11th President, 1845–49: His ancestors were among the first Ulster-Scots settlers, emigrating from Coleraine in 1680 to become a powerful political family in Mecklenburg County, North Carolina. He moved to Tennessee and became its governor before winning the presidency.
James Buchanan (Scotch-Irish)
15th President, 1857–61: Born in a log cabin (which has been relocated to his old school in Mercersburg, Pennsylvania), 'Old Buck' cherished his origins: "My Ulster blood is a priceless heritage". The Buchanans were originally from Deroran, near Omagh in County Tyrone where the ancestral home still stands. Buchanan also had pre-plantation Irish ancestry being a descendant of the O'Kanes from County Londonderry.   
Andrew Johnson (Irish & English)
17th President, 1865–69: His grandfather suppoosedly left Mounthill, near Larne in County Antrim around 1750 and settled in North Carolina he was of English ancestry. Andrew worked there as a tailor and ran a successful business in Greeneville, Tennessee, before being elected Vice-President. He became President following Abraham Lincoln's assassination. His Mother was Mary “Polly” McDonough of Irish ancestry 1782
Ulysses S. Grant (Possibly Irish, Scotch-Irish, English & Scottish)
18th President, 1869–77: The home of his maternal great-grandfather, John Simpson, at Dergenagh, County Tyrone, is the location for an exhibition on the eventful life of the victorious Civil War commander who served two terms as President. Grant visited his ancestral homeland in 1878. His grandmother was Rachel Kelley, the daughter of an Irish pioneer. Surname Kelly 
Chester A. Arthur (Scotch-Irish & English)
21st President, 1881–85: His election was the start of a quarter-century in which the White House was occupied by men of Ulster-Scots origins. His family left Dreen, near Cullybackey, County Antrim, in 1815. There is now an interpretive centre, alongside the Arthur Ancestral Home, devoted to his life and times.
Grover Cleveland (Irish, Anglo-Irish)
22nd and 24th President, 1885–89 and 1893–97: Born in New Jersey, he was the maternal grandson of merchant Abner Neal, who emigrated from County Antrim in the 1790s. He is the only president to have served non-consecutive terms. Stephen Grover Cleveland was born to Ann (née Neal) and Richard Falley Cleveland. Ann Neal was of Irish ancestry and Richard Falley Cleveland was of Anglo-Irish and English ancestry 
Benjamin Harrison (Scotch-Irish & English)
23rd President, 1889–93: His mother, Elizabeth Irwin, had Ulster-Scots roots through her two great-grandfathers, James Irwin and William McDowell. Harrison was born in Ohio and served as a brigadier general in the Union Army before embarking on a career in Indiana politics which led to the White House.
William McKinley (Scotch-Irish & English)
25th President, 1897–1901: Born in Ohio, the descendant of a farmer from Conagher, near Ballymoney, County Antrim, he was proud of his ancestry and addressed one of the national Scotch-Irish congresses held in the late 19th century. His second term as president was cut short by an assassin's bullet.
Theodore Roosevelt (Irish, Scotch-Irish, Dutch, Scotch, English & French)
26th President, 1901-09: His mother, Mittie Bulloch, had Ulster Scots ancestors who emigrated from Glenoe, County Antrim, in May 1729. Roosevelt praised "Irish Presbyterians" as "a bold and hardy race." However, he is also the man who said: "But a hyphenated American is not an American at all. This is just as true of the man who puts "native"* before the hyphen as of the man who puts German or Irish or English or French before the hyphen." (*Roosevelt was referring to "nativists", not American Indians, in this context)
William Howard Taft (Irish & English)
27th President 1909–13: His great great great grandfather, Robert Taft was born in 1640 in Ireland and immigrated to America, during the mid 17th century. Robert taft was from County Louth in the republic of Ireland, He died in Mendon, Worcester, Massachusetts.
Woodrow Wilson (Scotch-Irish)
28th President, 1913–21: Of Ulster-Scot descent on both sides of the family, his roots were very strong and dear to him. He was grandson of a printer from Dergalt, near Strabane, County Tyrone, whose former home is open to visitors. Throughout his career he reflected on the influence of his ancestral values on his constant quest for knowledge and fulfillment.
Warren G. Harding (Scotch-Irish & English)
29th President 1921–23
Harry S. Truman (Scotch-Irish & German)
33rd President 1945–53
John F. Kennedy (Irish)
35th President 1961–63 (ancestors from County Wexford)
Richard Nixon (Irish, Scotch-Irish, English & German)
37th President, 1969–74: The Nixon ancestors left Ulster in the mid-18th century; the Quaker Milhous family ties were with County Antrim and County Kildare and County Cork.
Jimmy Carter (Scotch-Irish & English)
39th President 1977–1981 (County Antrim)
Ronald Reagan (Irish, English & Scottish)
40th President 1981–89: He was the great-grandson, on his father's side, of Irish migrants from County Tipperary who came to America via Canada and England in the 1840s. His mother was of Scottish and English ancestry.
George H. W. Bush (Irish, & English)
41st President 1989–93: County Wexford historians have found that his now apparent ancestor, Richard de Clare, Earl of Pembroke (known as Strongbow for his arrow skills) – is remembered as a desperate, land-grabbing warlord whose calamitous foreign adventure led to the suffering of generations. Shunned by Henry II, he offered his services as a mercenary in the 12th-century invasion of Wexford in exchange for power and land. He would die from a festering ulcer in his foot, which his enemies said was the revenge of Irish saints whose shrines he had violated. The genetic line can also be traced to Dermot MacMurrough, the Gaelic king of Leinster reviled in history books as the man who sold Ireland by inviting Strongbow's invasion to save himself from a local feud.
Bill Clinton (Irish, Scotch-Irish & English)
42nd President 1993–2001: He claims Irish ancestry despite there being no documentation of any of his ancestors coming from Ireland
George W. Bush (Irish, Scottish, Dutch, Welsh, French, German & English)
43rd President 2001–09: One of his five times great-grandfathers, William Holliday, was born in Rathfriland, County Down, about 1755, and died in Kentucky about 1811–12. One of the President's seven times great-grandfathers, William Shannon, was born somewhere in County Cork about 1730, and died in Pennsylvania in 1784.
Barack Obama (Kenyan, English & Irish)
44th President 2009–2017: His paternal ancestors came to America from Kenya and his maternal ancestors came to America from England. His ancestors lived in New England and the South and by the 1800s most were in the Midwest. His father was Kenyan and the first of his family to leave Africa. His great great grandfather, Falmouth Kearney, was born in the Irish town of Moneygall.

Science
 Michael Collins – astronaut with Gemini 10 and Apollo 11 missions
 Jim Collins – Rhodes Scholar, MacArthur genius, bioengineer and inventor
 John Philip Holland – inventor of the submarine; Fenian
 Simon Hullihen – known as The Father of Oral Surgery 
 Charles McBurney – medical pioneer
O. Timothy O'Meara – mathematician, University of Notre Dame

Sports
 Derrick Williams
Muhammad Ali – former professional boxer
 Danny Amendola – NFL player
Lance Armstrong – professional road racing cyclist
 Cal Bowdler – former basketball player
 Brian Boyle – NHL player, Florida Panthers
 James J. Braddock – professional boxer
 Tom Brady – NFL player, Tampa Bay Buccaneers quarterback
 Joseph "Joe" Brennan – Basketball Hall of Famer 
 Courtney Brosnan, soccer player, international for Ireland
 Phillip Brooks (CM Punk) – WWE wrestler
 Tom Cahill – MLB baseball player
 Ryan Callahan – NHL player, Ottawa Senators
 Kyra Carusa – soccer player, international for Ireland
 Chris Coghlan – MLB baseball player
 Marty Conlon – former basketball player
 Billy Conn – professional boxer
 Dan Connolly – former NFL player
 George Connor – NFL player, Chicago Bears
 Gerry Cooney – professional boxer
 James J. Corbett – professional boxer
 Charlie Coyle – NHL player, Boston Bruins
 Matt Cullen – former NHL player
 John Daly – professional golfer
 Jack Dempsey – professional boxer
 Pat Duff – MLB professional baseball player
 Mike Dunleavy Sr. – basketball coach
 Mike Dunleavy Jr. – professional basketball player 
 Patrick Eaves – NHL player, Anaheim Ducks 
 Julian Edelman – NFL player, New England Patriots
 John Elway – NFL player, Denver Broncos quarterback
 Dave Finlay – former professional wrestler 
 Whitey Ford – MLB player, New York Yankees pitcher
 Mike Gibbons – professional boxer
 Tommy Gibbons – professional boxer
 Mike Hall – professional basketball player 
 Noah Hanifin – NHL player, Calgary Flames
 Luke Harangody – professional basketball player
 Jeff Hardy – WWE wrestler
 Matt Hardy – WWE wrestler
 Ben Hogan – professional golfer
 Holly Holm – MMA fighter
 Derek Jeter – MLB player, New York Yankees shortstop
 Patrick Kane – NHL player, Chicago Blackhawks
 Jason Kidd – NBA player/coach
 Joe Lapira – soccer player, had 1 cap for Ireland
 Jay Larranaga – basketball coach
 Jim Larranaga – basketball coach
 Katie Ledecky – Olympic swimmer
 Tommy Loughran – professional boxer
 Brian McCann – MLB player, catcher for the Houston Astros
 John McEnroe – professional tennis player
 Donnie McGrath – professional basketball player
 Terry McGovern – professional boxer
 Kevin McHale – NBA player
 Larry Miggins – MLB player, St. Louis Cardinals outfielder
 Shannon Moore – TNA wrestler
 Charles "Stretch"Murphy – late Basketball Hall of Famer
 Connor Murphy – NHL player, Chicago Blackhawks
 Troy Murphy – basketball player 
 Larry O'Bannon – basketball player
 Philadelphia Jack O'Brien – professional boxer
 Patrick O'Bryant – basketball player 
 Mike O'Dowd – professional boxer
 Ian O'Leary – professional basketball player
 Troy O'Leary – MLB player, Boston Red Sox outfielder
 Ted Potter Jr. – professional golfer
 Jonathan Quick – NHL player, Los Angeles Kings
 Bob Quinn – current general manager of the Detroit Lions
 Dan Quinn – NFL head coach of the Atlanta Falcons
 John Quinlan – pro wrestler
 Ryan Max Riley – skier, US Ski Team
 Freddie Roach – former boxer, current boxing trainer
 Kevin Rooney – NHL player, New Jersey Devils
 Ryan Shannon – NHL professional hockey player, won the Stanley Cup with Anaheim in 2007
 Sheamus – professional wrestler 
 Kelly Slater – professional surfer
 Sam Snead – PGA Golf Hall of Famer 
 Erik Spoelstra – NBA Head coach (Dutch-Irish American father)
 Giancarlo Stanton – MLB player, Miami Marlins outfielder
 John L. Sullivan – professional boxer, first Heavyweight champion of gloved boxing
 Gene Tunney – professional boxer
 Mickey Walker – professional boxer
 Andre Ward – professional boxer
 Mickey Ward – professional boxer
 Lenny Wilkens – professional basketball player
 Aaron Rodgers – NFL player, Green Bay Packers
 Tom Harmon  American football – former NFL player

Others
 Billy the Kid – gunslinger
 Thomas Fitzpatrick (trapper) – aka Thomas Fitzpatrick broken hand.
 John Kinney Gang
 Lawrence Murphy
 Bill Doolin
 Hugh Glass
 John Daly (outlaw)
 Hopalong Cassidy
 Jesse Lincoln Driskill Cowboy 1824–1890
 Tom O'Day
 Sir William Johnson, 1st Baronet
 George Shannon (explorer)
 Joseph Breen – Production Code director
 Frank E. Butler – marksman
 The "Unsinkable" Molly Brown – born Molly Tobin; Irish-born father
 R. Nicholas Burns – American diplomat, Harvard professor, columnist and lecturer; 19th Undersecretary of State for Political Affairs; 17th United States Permanent Representative to NATO; United States Ambassador to Greece 1997–2001
 Mark Calaway – pro wrestler with the WWE, known as the "Undertaker"
 John Chambers (1922–2001) – Academy Award-winning makeup artist 
 Cheiro – astrologer 
 Eileen Collins – first female commander of a Space Shuttle
 Éamon de Valera – third president of Ireland
 John Dunlap – printer, printed the first copies of the Declaration of Independence
 Wyatt Earp – lawman
 Henry Louis Gates – professor at Harvard University
 Cedric Gibbons – art director
 Ann Glover – hanged as a witch in Boston
 Dan Harrington – world poker champion
 James Healy – Bishop of Portland, America's first African-American bishop; born a slave according to the laws of Georgia to an Irish immigrant and his beloved African wife; first graduate and valedictorian of Holy Cross College in Massachusetts
 Michael Healy – Captain of the Revenue Cutter Bear; defender of Alaska's Native Americans; inspiration for Jack London's The Sea Wolf; prominent figure in James Michener's Alaska; younger brother of James and Patrick Healy
 Patrick Healy – President of Georgetown University, considered its second founder; brother of James Healy; first African-American president of an American university; Priest in the Society of Jesus (the Jesuits)
 James Hoban – Architect of the White House in Washington, DC
 Mary Jemison – frontierswoman
 Bat Masterson – lawman 
 Jacqueline Kennedy Onassis – former First Lady; her mother, Janet Lee Bouvier, was of mostly Irish descent
 Margaret McCarthy – migrant
 Marguerite Moore – orator, patriot, activist
 Paul Charles Morphy – chess player
 Coco Rocha – Canadian model of Irish, Welsh, and Russian descent
 Ellen Ewing Sherman – stepsister and wife of William Tecumseh Sherman. Because they would have needed to buy a slave to help with the children, Mrs. Sherman refused to accompany her husband to command at the Louisiana military academy, which later became LSU. During the Civil War, she and their children took up residence at Notre Dame University, with which her family was closely affiliated.
 David Steele – Presbyterian minister
 John L. Sullivan – last bare-knuckle boxing heavyweight champion of the world; first gloved heavyweight champion of the world; first American athlete to become a national celebrity and to earn over $1 million
 Andrew Anglin – Neo-Nazi, founder, and proprietor of The Daily Stormer; a white supremacist, anti-Semitic news and commentary website.
 Kathleen Willey – major figure in the Paula Jones and Monica Lewinsky scandals involving President Bill Clinton; mother is of Irish descent
 Vince McMahon – professional wrestling promoter and executive American football executive Businessman (paternal grandmother is Irish descent)
 Seth Rollins – professional wrestler (Irish descent)
 Dana White – American businessman and current president of the Ultimate Fighting Championship (UFC)
 Kayleigh McEnany
Bill Murray
Mariah Carey
Harrison Ford
John C. Reilly
Macaulay Culkin
Susan Sarandon
Anne Hathaway
Billie Eilish

References

External links

 IrishAmerica.com
 The Irish-born signatories of the American Declaration of Independence
 Coffin ships
 The American Irish Historical Society
 Early Irish Immigration to USA
 Irish immigrant soldiers in the Civil War

American
 
Irish
Americans
Irish